King Yuan of Zhou personal name Ji Ren, was the twenty-seventh king of the Chinese Zhou dynasty and the fifteenth of Eastern Zhou. He ruled from 476 BC to 469 BC. He was succeeded by his son, Prince Jie, who ruled as King Zhending of Zhou from 468 BC to 441 BC.

Ancestry

See also
 Family tree of ancient Chinese emperors

Sources 

469 BC deaths
Zhou dynasty kings
5th-century BC Chinese monarchs
Year of birth unknown